David Colin Kendix (born 2 April 1966) is an English actuary, cricket statistician and scorer. He is also the current treasurer of Middlesex County Cricket Club since 1 January 2016.

He is responsible for calculating and updating the ICC Team cricket rankings. He has designed the ranking systems of all three formats of the game, namely, Tests, ODIs and T20Is. Kendix had earlier worked with the English Cricket Board over various issues before being contacted by the ICC for devising ODI rankings in 2002, the Test ranking the following year replacing the system devised by former Wisden almanac editor, Matthew Engel, and now for T20I. His system involves awarding points for individual matches in a series as well as a bonus for the series winners over a period of 3–4 years, with more preference to recent matches as well keeping in account the ratings of the two teams.

Kendix has been the official scorer for all Tests and ODIs played at Lord's since the England vs West Indies test in 1995 and a member of the ICC Cricket Committee from 2006. He has been a scorer in 13 test matches and 8 ODIs, though is an actuary by profession.

He has also developed the ranking system used by the International Netball Federation.

References

1966 births
Living people
English cricket administrators
Cricket scorers
British actuaries
British statisticians